Ulysses Shelton (July 1, 1917 – June 13, 1981) was an American Democratic politician who served as a member of the Pennsylvania House of Representatives from 1969 to 1978. He was born in Florida to Wright and Leila Arline Shelton. He died in June 1981 at the age of 63. The House passed a memorial resolution in honor of him in 1983. He lived in Philadelphia.

References 

1917 births
1981 deaths
20th-century American politicians
Democratic Party members of the Pennsylvania House of Representatives
African-American state legislators in Pennsylvania